Storfjorden or Storfjord (meaning "big fjord" in Norwegian) may refer to several places in Norway:

Fjords
Storfjorden (Sunnmøre), a fjord in the Sunnmøre district of Møre og Romsdal county
Storfjorden (Svalbard), a body of water separating Spitsbergen from Barentsøya and Edgeøya in Svalbard
Storfjorden, Troms, a branch off the main Lyngen fjord in Troms county
Storfjorden, a branch off the main Velfjorden in Brønnøy municipality, Nordland county
Storfjorden, a branch off the main Laksefjorden in Lebesby municipality, Finnmark county
Storfjorden, the innermost part of the Hjørundfjorden in Ørsta municipality, Møre og Romsdal county

Other places
Storfjord, a municipality in Troms county
Storfjord Bridge, a proposed suspension bridge that would span Storfjorden in Sunnmøre, Norway
Storfjord Church, a church in Storfjord municipality, Troms county
Storfjord Station, a former hunting and radio station in East Greenland